Cameraria shenaniganensis is a moth of the family Gracillariidae. It is known from California, United States.

The length of the forewings is 3.1-4.2 mm.

The larvae feed on Quercus chrysolepis. They mine the leaves of their host plant. The mine is irregular and oblong to quadrate. The epidermis is opaque, yellow green. All mines cross the midrib and consume 50%-90% of the leaf surface. The mines are solitary and have two parallel folds.

Etymology
The specific name is derived from the type-locality (Shenanigan Flat) and the Latin suffix -ensis (denoting place, locality)

References

Cameraria (moth)
Moths described in 1981

Moths of North America
Lepidoptera of the United States
Leaf miners
Fauna of California
Taxa named by Paul A. Opler
Taxa named by Donald R. Davis (entomologist)